Chris Boulos (born 20 August 1996) is a Lebanese track and field sprinter . He represented his country in the men's 60 metres at the 2018 IAAF World Indoor Championships.

References

External links

1996 births
Living people
Lebanese male sprinters
Place of birth missing (living people)